Anna David (born 2 December 1984) is a Danish R&B and soul singer. At the age of fourteen she got her first recording contract in Germany where she released five singles. Her debut album, simply titled Anna David, was released in Denmark in September 2005 and was certified Gold. The lead single, Fuck Dig, held the #1 position on Danish single chart for twelve weeks and received the 'Payload Prize 2005' for being the most downloaded song of the year in Denmark. In October 2006, David recorded "Fuck dig" in  German as "Fick Dich". The German version entered the charts in both Germany and Austria. Simultaneously, she recorded "Fuck You", an English version of the song.

In 2006, she participated in the Danish version of Dancing with the Stars.

Discography 
2005: Anna David
2007: 2
2009: Tættere på
2010: Music is Taking Over

Singles 
2000: "P.Y.B. (Pretty Young Boy)" with Christoph Brüx, Toni Cottura
2001: "U and Me and the Sunshine"
2002: "Impossible"
2002: "Terminal Love"
2005: "Fuck dig" ("Fuck deg" in Norwegian covered by Sichelle)
2006: "Fuck You" (in English)
2006: "Fick Dich" (in German)
2005: "Hvad nu hvis?"
2006: "Når musikken spiller"
2006: "Kys mig"
2007: "Nr. 1"
2007: "Chill"
2007: "Den lille pige"
2009: "Tæt på"
2009: "Den sommer" 
2009: "All About Love" featuring Mohamed Ali
2010: "Bow (for the Bad Girls)"
2014: "It Hurts"
2020: "Tag Top"

Other songs 
 "Mavepuster" – Jokeren featuring Anna David from Jokeren's album Jigolo Jesus
 "My Sunshine" – Demo song presented on her MySpace
 "Næh næh" – Single by Ufo Yepha feat. Anna David on their album Kig mig i øjnene
 "Flip Reverse" – B-Side to the "Fick Dich" single
 "You Drive Me Crazy" – B-Side to the "Impossible" and "Terminal Love" singles
 "Recognise Me" – B-Side to the "Terminal Love" single
 "Drop Mobning" – A version of "Fuck Dig" with different lyrics, used for the '"Drop Mobning" campaign

References

External links 
 Official Danish website
 Official Danish MySpace
 Official German website
 Official German MySpace
 

1984 births
Living people
Polydor Records artists
English-language singers from Denmark
Singers from Aarhus
21st-century Danish  women singers